The women's 1500 metres race of the 2013–14 ISU Speed Skating World Cup 2, arranged in the Utah Olympic Oval, in Salt Lake City, United States, was held on November 16, 2013.

Ireen Wüst of the Netherlands won the race, while Brittany Bowe and Heather Richardson, both of the United States, came second and third, respectively. Natalia Czerwonka of Poland won the Division B race.

Results
The race took place on Saturday, November 16, with Division B scheduled in the morning session, at 10:18, and Division A scheduled in the afternoon session, at 14:51.

Division A

Division B

References

Women 1500
2